God And Gun is a 1995 Indian Bollywood action drama film directed by Esmayeel Shroff and produced by Kulbhushan Gupta. It stars Raaj Kumar, Raj Babbar, Jackie Shroff, Gautami in lead roles. It was the final film of veteran actor Raaj Kumar before his death in 1996 and was also the final film of Paidi Jairaj after completing 66 years in Bollywood.

Plot 
Saheb Bahadur Rathore is the only person has courage to stand against corrupt and powerful politician Satya Singh. Satya wants to win the upcoming election by hook or by crook. On the other side Vijay Prakash, a young man also set up a plan to kill corrupt politicians like Satya. Although the paths of Vijay and Saheb Bahadur are different, still they befriended to fight against corruption.

Cast
 Raaj Kumar as Raj Bahadur Rathore
 Raj Babbar as Police Commissioner Avtar Singh
 Jackie Shroff as Vijay Prakash
 Gautami as Sujata Singh
 Prem Chopra as Balraj Sahu
 Sadashiv Amrapurkar as Satya Singh
 Rakesh Bedi as Bhola

Soundtrack

References

External links

1990s Hindi-language films
1995 films
Films scored by Anand–Milind
Indian action films
Indian films about revenge
1995 action films